Émile Duployé was a French clergyman, born in 1833 in Liesse-Notre-Dame (Aisne) and died in 1912 in Saint-Maur-des-Fosses (now in Val-de-Marne).

He is the author of the Duployan shorthand technique which was widely used in France in the early twentieth century.

He wrote a series of books on this subject, whose first edition was named Stenography-Duployé, writing easier, faster and more readable than any other, which applies to all languages (published in Lyon in 1860).

See also
Catholic Church in France

References 

1833 births
1912 deaths
French male writers
French Roman Catholic clergy
Shorthand systems